Rustico may refer to:

 Rustico (pastry), Italian snack of Salento made with puff pastry and a stuffing
 Rustico Torrecampo (born 1972), Filipino boxer

See also
 North Rustico, town in Queens County, Prince Edward Island, Canada
 Rustico-Emerald, provincial electoral district in Prince Edward Island, Canada
 Rustico Farm & Cellars, heritage building in British Columbia, Canada